Admiral Administration was a specialist hedge fund administrator  founded in 1996. In 2012 they became the specialist hedge fund administrator for the Maitland Group.

History 

Following their acquisition by Maitland in 2012, the company continued to trade as Admiral Administration under an operating entity under that name in South Africa. However, in 2015 they began the process of rebranding fully as Maitland. This allows for the insourcing of international work onto the Maitland technology platform in Cape Town, South Africa.
The acquisition by Maitland came about following the industry collapse of 2008. It was important for Admiral to have more ballast in the market to appeal more readily to established managers and their institutional investors.

References 

Institutional investors
Alternative investment management companies